Route 135 is a highway in central Missouri.  Its northern terminus is at Interstate 70/U.S. Route 40/Route 41 west of Boonville; its southern terminus is at Route 5 near the Lake of the Ozarks.

It passes through Cooper, Pettis, and Morgan counties.  Southbound Route 135 runs concurrent with eastbound US 50 in Pettis and Morgan counties, with northbound Route 135 running concurrent with westbound US 50 over the same portion of US 50. Ozarks International Raceway is located along the highway.

Major intersections

References

135
Transportation in Cooper County, Missouri
Transportation in Pettis County, Missouri
Transportation in Morgan County, Missouri